Ronald John Bilsland Colville, 2nd Baron Clydesmuir, KT, CB, MBE, TD (21 May 1917 – 2 October 1996), was a Scottish soldier and businessman. He notably served as Governor of the Bank of Scotland, Lord Lieutenant of Lanarkshire, and Captain General of the Queen's Bodyguard in Scotland. He was described as "an outstanding and dedicated servant of Scotland. He was a gentleman of the old school with a genial wit and great generosity of spirit".

Early life
Colville was born in Glasgow, the only son of John Colville, Secretary of State for Scotland (1938–40), who became Governor of Bombay (1943–48) and acted as Viceroy and Governor-General of India on three occasions, who was raised to the peerage in 1948 as Baron Clydesmuir. Like his father, he was educated at Charterhouse and at Trinity College, Cambridge.

Military career
Graduating from Cambridge in 1939 Colville was drawn, at the age of 22, into World War II. The tradition of service was already ingrained, he joined a Scottish regiment, the Cameronians (Scottish Rifles) in which his father had served in World War I. Clydesmuir was in action with the regiment at Dunkirk, in Italy, and in the Normandy landings, was awarded the MBE and mentioned in despatches, serving throughout World War II and for a short time thereafter. The Cameronians were famously recruited from Glasgow and the Lanarkshire area, the industrial heart of Scotland. Clydesmuir's obituary noted "he always remained a West of Scotland man respecting and sharing the down-to-earth qualities of the men with whom he had fought. It was typical of him and of them that some of his merriest and most affectionate anecdotes, (and he was a master story-teller), had to do with the lighter off-duty events of these dangerous days and with the lifelong friends he made among his comrades in arms".

His military experiences poignantly influenced his later life and after the war, he continued his connections with the Army. Among his other appointments, he became Chairman of the Council of the Territorial, Auxiliary and Volunteer Associations (1969–73), and later President, (1974–81); commanded the 6/7th (Territorial) battalion of the Cameronians, and later became Honorary Colonel (1967–71); he was also Honorary Colonel of the 52nd Lowland Volunteers, TA&VR (1970–75). His obituary also noted "he never lost the upright and alert bearing, the directness of speech and method, and the disciplined self-control he had acquired in his army days. Nor did he forget the debts owed to the men who had served with him and, in many cases, suffered and died".

Business career

His obituary commented "that it was probably inevitable that Clydesmuir should join the family business on his return from the war and it was also in character that he should work his way up the hard way, successfully". He became a Director of Colvilles Limited in 1958. Meantime his lively personality, his abilities, and his connections caused him to be in demand in many other spheres. One of these was the Scottish Council (Development & Industry), a body established in the thirties under the leadership of his uncle, Lord Bilsland, to encourage the introduction of new, lighter industries to reduce the over-dependence of central Scotland on declining heavy industry and to develop export markets. After the war, the efforts to this effect continued with considerable success. Clydesmuir joined the Executive Committee in 1954, became its chairman in 1966, and President of the Council in 1972, an appointment he held until 1986. In these entirely voluntary roles, he worked tirelessly in productive association with successive chief executives, not least the redoubtable Dr. Willie Robertson, and he led pioneering and successful trade missions to the Soviet Union and China.

Despite being exceptionally generous with his time to various voluntary organizations, he became increasingly preoccupied with business interests particularly in the field of banking and finance and from an early stage in the developing Scottish oil and gas industry. Since his appearance on the scene after the war he had been in demand as a non-executive director and among his early appointments was as a director of the British Linen Bank, then a wholly-owned subsidiary of Barclays Bank. He was appointed Governor of that bank in 1966 and on its merger with the Bank of Scotland in 1971, he became Deputy Governor of the merged bank. In 1972, on the resignation of Lord Polwarth to take up a political appointment, he was elected Governor of the Bank of Scotland, an office he held with distinction until his retirement in 1981. During his time as governor of the bank, he was also a director of Barclays Bank. His period as Governor of the Bank of Scotland saw many changes and his leadership showed itself first in the successful and productive completion of the integration of the two banks and thereafter in the imaginative use of new technology and in the profitable expansion of the Bank's business, domestically within Scotland, in England and internationally. From an era when the high business office is often associated in the public mind with self-seeking, it is salutary to look back on his career which was one of impeccably unselfish dedication to the organization he led, and served.

Honours
His obituary noted "the distinctions and honors bestowed upon Lord Clydesmuir are indicative of the high regard in which he was held. In addition to his war-time awards, he was appointed CB in 1965 and became a Knight of the Thistle in 1972. He was Lord High Commissioner to the General Assembly of the Church of Scotland, in 1971 and 1972. He held office as Lord Lieutenant of Lanarkshire from 1963 to 1992, having been Deputy Lieutenant (1955–59) and Vice-Lieutenant (1959–63). He was a long-serving member of the Royal Company of Archers, Queen's Body Guard for Scotland, and from 1986 until shortly before his death he held the office of Captain General. He also held honorary degrees awarded by Strathclyde and Heriot-Watt Universities."

In 1978 he was elected an Honorary Fellow of the Royal Society of Edinburgh.

Family
Clydesmuir, whose family name was Colville, was from a long-established Scottish family. He was a great-grandson of David Colville, founder of the huge iron and steel enterprise which, as Colvilles Limited, became a renowned and powerful force in the industrial development of the United Kingdom; and son of John Colville, a former Secretary of State for Scotland (1938–40), who became Governor of Bombay (1943–48) and acted as Viceroy and Governor-General of India on three occasions. He was raised to the peerage in 1948 as the first Baron Clydesmuir of Braidwood. He succeeded to the title in 1954 on the death of his father. Lord Bilsland another Scottish Industrialist was his uncle. He married Joan Booth, daughter of Lieutenant-Colonel E.B. Booth DSO, RAMC of Darver Castle, Dundalk, County Louth. Joan's younger sister was Lady McCorkell OBE who married Colonel Sir Michael McCorkell. Clydesmuir is survived by his children David, who inherited the title on his passing, Diana, Andrew, and Anne.

Notes

References
Kidd, Charles, Williamson, David (editors). Debrett's Peerage and Baronetage (1990 edition). New York: St Martin's Press, 1990,

External links
Cracrofts Peerage

[Cameron, Alan (1996), ‘Bank of Scotland (1695–1995)’ Mainstream Publishing Bank of Scotland]
Queen Elizabeth’s tour of Scotland

1917 births
1996 deaths
People educated at Charterhouse School
Alumni of Trinity College, Cambridge
2
Ronald
People associated with South Lanarkshire
Companions of the Order of the Bath
Knights of the Thistle
Members of the Order of the British Empire
Members of the Royal Company of Archers
Cameronians officers
British Army personnel of World War II

pl:Baron Clydesmuir